Margery Audrey Bates (Clayton Wallis) (1928-2014) was a British-American computer programmer who, in 1948, wrote the earliest program for lambda calculus calculations on the Manchester Mark I computer.

Career 
Bates graduated with a First in Mathematics from University of Manchester in the summer of 1949. She was taken on as a research student by Alan Turing, and shared an office with him and Cicely Popplewell. In 1950 Bates submitted an MSc thesis entitled "The mechanical solution of a problem in Church's Lambda calculus". This thesis documents a successful attempt to carry out higher-order logical reasoning on the extremely primitive Manchester Mark I electronic computer.

When the Manchester Mark I was commercialised by the local electronics firm Ferranti, Bates moved to work with them as a programmer. Whilst at Ferranti she composed several sections (some uncredited) of Vivian Bowdon's Faster Than Thought, a popular introduction to electronic computing.

In 1952, Bates went to work on the FERUT, the Ferranti Mark I installed at the University of Toronto. In 1955, Bates was pictured supervising the FERUT when it carried out the first automated remote access to a computer. 

In 1979, Bates was working as a 'futurist' at a US military think tank.

Personal life 
Bates married twice and had four children. Her first husband, Ken Wallis, was a fellow Ferranti programmer; her second husband was Leigh Clayton and it was under the name of Clayton that Bates published her later work.

References 

British women computer scientists
Alumni of the University of Manchester
1928 births
2014 deaths